Olavi Kauko Puro was born on 18 November 1918 in Helsinki and died on 20 June 1999. He was one of the top scoring aces in the Finnish Air Force with 36 confirmed victories.

Biography
Puro served in Fighter Squadrons (LLv's): 6 and 24 during the Second World War. He became an ace in 1943. Puro was actively flying at the front almost during the whole war.

During his 207 combat missions, Olavi Puro scored 36 confirmed victories in I-153s, Brewster Buffaloes and Bf 109 Gs. Puro was relieved from service at the end of the war in 1944 and took up a job as a data processing director at a bank. Olavi Puro's memoirs have been published as the book Mersu-ässe (Koala publishing house, 2011).

Victories
Puro claimed the following numbers of victories in each type of aircraft he flew:

References

Notes

Bibliography

 Keskinen, Kalevi; Stenman, Kari and Niska, Klaus. Hävittäjä-ässät (Finnish Fighter Aces) (in Finnish). Espoo, Finland: Tietoteas, 1978. .

Further reading 
 Olavi Puro : Mersu-ässä. Koala-kustannus, Helsinki 2011

See also
 List of World War II aces from Finland

1918 births
1999 deaths
Military personnel from Helsinki
Finnish Air Force personnel
Finnish people of World War II
Finnish World War II flying aces